Bucculatrix atagina is a moth in the family Bucculatricidae. It was described by Maximilian Ferdinand Wocke in 1876. It is found in the Alps.

The larvae feed on Artemisia campestris. They mine the leaves of their host plant.

References

Natural History Museum Lepidoptera generic names catalog

External links
Images representing Bucculatrix atagena at Consortium for the Barcode of Life

Bucculatricidae
Moths described in 1876
Taxa named by Maximilian Ferdinand Wocke
Moths of Europe
Leaf miners